José Cibrián (February 25, 1916 – December 28, 2002), nicknamed Pepe, was an Argentine actor. Born in Buenos Aires, where he also died, he has an extensive filmography, including well-received movies such as Pájaro loco and La Cigarra no es un bicho.
He starred in over 45 films between 1940 and 1981.

1940s filmography
 Amor de mis Amores (1940)
 Jesús de Nazareth (1942) ... Jesús
 Santa (1943) ... Hipolito
 El Hombre de La Mascara de Hierro (1943)
 El Globo de Cantoya (1943)
 Asi son Ellas (1944)
 La Trepadora (1944)
 La Hija del Regimiento (1944)
 Tribunal de Justicia (1944)
 The Lieutenant Nun (1944)
 El Secreto de la solterona (1945)
 Soltera y con gemelos (1945)
 Su Gran Ilusión (1945)
 Como tu Ninguna (1946)
 Más allá del Amor (1946)
 Los Maridos Engañan de 7 a 9 (1946)
 El Desquite (1947)
 No te cases con mi mujer (1947)
 La Mujer que quiere a dos (1947)
 The Earring (1951)

External links
 

Argentine people of Spanish descent
Argentine people of Basque descent
Argentine male film actors
Argentine male radio actors
Argentine expatriates in Spain
Argentine expatriates in Mexico
Male actors from Buenos Aires
1916 births
2002 deaths
Burials at La Chacarita Cemetery